Julia Mächtig (born 1 January 1986 in Rostock) is a German heptathlete. She has a personal best of 6430 points for the event.

She began competing in heptathlon competitions from a young age. She placed eighth at the 2003 World Youth Championships in Athletics then won her first international medals as a junior athlete, taking bronze at the 2004 World Junior Championships and silver at the 2005 European Athletics Junior Championships. She won the German senior long jump title in 2006. In the 2007 season she won her first national heptathlon title and placed third at the 2007 European Athletics U23 Championships. She also made her senior international debut at the 2007 European Athletics Indoor Championships, where she came ninth in the women's pentathlon.

Mächtig represented Germany at the World Championships in Athletics in 2009, 2011 and 2013. She placed ninth with 6265 points on her debut outing, but was less successful in 2011 with her 17th-place finish. In 2012 she won the Mehrkampf-Meeting Ratingen with a personal best score of 6341 points, which included a long jump best of 6.49 metres.  In 2013, she improved her personal best at the Ratingen meet.

Achievements

References

External links

1986 births
Living people
German heptathletes
Sportspeople from Rostock
Athletes (track and field) at the 2012 Summer Olympics
Olympic athletes of Germany
20th-century German women
21st-century German women